Mathur Madhabhai Savani is a businessman and social worker from Gujarat, India. He established a diamond firm Savani Brothers. He worked in the field of water conservation in Saurashtra region of Gujarat..

Biography 
Mathur Madhabhai Savani was born on 12 January 1963 in Khopala, Bhavnagar district (now Botad district), Gujarat, India. He completed his primary education in his village. He migrated to Surat in 1975 and started working in the diamond industry in Gopipura area. Later he established a diamond firm, Savani Brothers, in 1980. During on of his business trips, he was impressed by the water management in Israel and decided to establish an organisation in Indian aimed at water conservation.

Social work 
He established Saurashtra Jaldhara Trust to spread awareness regarding water conservation in 1997. He carried out awareness campaign and took walks across dry and water short Saurashtra region of Gujarat. He worked extensively to construct check dams across Saurashtra by community participation and government support.
He later cofounded "Beti Bachao Abhiyan" to spread awareness regarding female infanticide.

Water conservation 
 3250 meetings in villages of Saurastra, Kutch and North Gujarat, visit of 350 villages and tour for 1500 days were organised. Three Conventions at state level, Seven Conventions at dist. level and Five Gram Shibirs were organised.
 Bhimdad to Bhadrod 150 - km. long Padayatra was organised with 500 Padyatris for 10 days.
 Talgajrda to Porbandar 325 - km long Padayatra was organised with 1000 Padyatris for 20 days. 
 Represented for "Sardar Patel Sahbhagi Jalsanchay Yojna" with People's Participation, which got a Govt. nod. In which 80% of construction cost to be borne by the Govt.  & 20% to be borne by the villagers.
 For Excavation of Check-dams & Farm ponds 40 JCB Machines were purchased from the fund obtained from the donors & provided free of cost to the villagers. Only diesel cost was to be borne by the people. Moreover, Trust has supplied 2 lacs bags of cement free of cost, to inspire the village water committees. 
 50 lacs booklets, pamphlets, folders, leaflets were distributed, 50 thousand video CDs were distributed and Telefilm in 2950 villages were shown by mobile van.

Save the girl campaign  
For the Save the girl child campaign:
 Mahaprasad ladu'' of 10,000 kg was prepared on 01-01-2006. 1.2 million people gathered at the same time, same day & same site on first January-2006 & took the lunch. Same thing is recorded in the " Limca Book of World Record ". “Prasad”'' packets were prepared and distributed in each home of 18,000 villages with a message to “Save Girl Child and Female Foetus”
 “Female feticide”, to remove this evil, activities were carried out from 2002, in which many social activists of Gujarat joined. In 2006, 
 2.52 lakh households took a handful of flour and directly and made it into a maha laddu. The offerings were distributed to 35 lakh households in every village of Gujarat and the message that feticide should be stopped was given. 12 lakh people took an oath together to stop the killing of female foetuses.
 A car rally of 300 cars from Surat to Somnath, was organised. An oath to “Save Girl Child and Female Foetus” was taken in the presence of Somnath Mahadev. 
 One lakh girl students wrote 2 lakh post cards having message to “Save Girl Child and Female Foetus” in twelve minutes and posted for 18,000  villages of Gujarat.
 Result of these mass awakening and awareness, the girl birth rate increased from 770 to  870 per 1000 boys within a period of one year.

Housing
 Food, clothes and shelter are the basic needs of everyone. 50% of village people residing in city don't have their own houses. So as to provide "Own House" at a concessional rate to every person of Gadhada taluka residing in Surat, the "Gadhpur Township" scheme was prepared. Acquired the building materials by creating awareness for social responsibilities among the producers of building materials and donors. The Govt's assistance was also received in a direct or indirect manner.
 The scheme to provide 1250 houses to homeless people on "No Profit No Loss" basis, was successfully implemented by collective efforts of Saurastra Jaldhara Trust.

Awards and honors 
He was awarded Padma Shri, the fourth highest civilian award in India, in 2014 for his contribution in social works.

 Padma Shri Award for the year 2014 by the President of India. New Delhi
 Gujarat Govt's Chief Minister - Public Health award for the year 1998–0999
 Chief Minister- Roupya Chandrak Purskar for the year 2001
 Gujarat Gaurav Deen Sanman Purskar for the year 2004
 Patidar Ratnshri" Award from Akhil Gujarat Patidar Parisad
 Rajshri Award" from Sandipani Vidhya Niketan, Probandar for the year 2005

Apart from this he was awarded with more than 1000 awards and Letter of Appreciation by many voluntary educational institutes, associations and village committees of Saurastra,  Kutch & North Gujarat.

References 

1963 births
Living people
People from Surat
Recipients of the Padma Shri in social work
Indian cooperative organizers
Social workers from Gujarat
20th-century Indian businesspeople
People from Botad district
Water conservation in India